Carlos Sánchez is an actor and humourist from the Dominican Republic.

Career 
Radio

Television

Theatre

Comedy shows
“Cuentos para enamorar”

Filmography

References 

Living people

Dominican Republic people of Spanish descent
Dominican Republic male film actors
Dominican Republic humorists
White Dominicans
21st-century male actors

Year of birth missing (living people)